The following is a list of municipal electoral districts in Montreal. They were created for electoral purposes and are based on historical boundaries of neighborhoods and former towns or cities.

Ahuntsic-Cartierville 
 Ahuntsic
 Bordeaux-Cartierville
 Saint-Sulpice
 Sault-au-Récollet

Anjou 
 Anjou-Centre
 Anjou-Est
 Anjou-Ouest

Côte-des-Neiges–Notre-Dame-de-Grâce 
 Côte-des-Neiges
 Darlington
 Loyola
 Notre-Dame-de-Grâce
 Snowdon

Lachine 
 Canal
 Fort-Rolland
 J.-Émery-Provost

LaSalle 
 Cecil-P.-Newman
 Sault-Saint-Louis

Le Plateau-Mont-Royal 
 DeLorimier
 Jeanne-Mance
 Mile End

Le Sud-Ouest 
 Saint-Henri–Petite-Bourgogne–Pointe-Saint-Charles
 Saint-Paul-Émard

L'Île-Bizard–Sainte-Geneviève 
 Denis-Benjamin-Viger
 Jacques-Bizard
 Pierre-Foretier
 Sainte-Geneviève

Mercier–Hochelaga-Maisonneuve 
 Hochelaga
 Louis-Riel
 Maisonneuve-Longue-Pointe
 Tétreaultville

Montréal-Nord 
 Marie-Clarac
 Ovide-Clermont

Outremont 
 Claude-Ryan
 Jeanne-Sauvé
 Joseph-Beaubien
 Robert-Bourassa

Pierrefonds-Roxboro 
 Pierrefonds-Roxboro-Est
 Pierrefonds-Roxboro-Ouest

Rivière-des-Prairies–Pointe-aux-Trembles 
 La Pointe-aux-Prairies
 Pointe-aux-Trembles
 Rivière-des-Prairies

Rosemont–La Petite-Patrie 
 Étienne-Desmarteau
 Marie-Victorin
 Saint-Édouard
 Vieux-Rosemont

Saint-Laurent 
 Côte-de-Liesse
 Normand-McLaren

Saint-Léonard 
 Saint-Léonard-Est
 Saint-Léonard-Ouest

Verdun 
 Champlain–L’Île-des-Sœurs
 Desmarchais-Crawford

Ville-Marie 
 Peter-McGill
 Saint-Jacques
 Sainte-Marie

Villeray–Saint-Michel–Parc-Extension 
 François-Perrault
 Parc-Extension
 Saint-Michel (former Ville Saint-Michel)
 Villeray

See also 
Boroughs of Montreal
List of neighbourhoods in Montreal
Montreal City Council

Municipal government of Montreal
Municipal electoral districts